Moshtanets is a village in Blagoevgrad Municipality, in Blagoevgrad Province, Bulgaria. It is situated on the right bank of Struma river southwest of Blagoevgrad.

References

Villages in Blagoevgrad Province